Correguaje (Korewaje, Ko'reuaju) is a Tucanoan language of Colombia.

The language was spoken in the film Out of the Dark.

Phonology 
Koreguaje has 6 vowels: /a, e, i, ɨ, o, u/. All vowels have nasalized forms.

References

Languages of Colombia
Tucanoan languages